Katherine Dumar (born 27 September 1993) is a Colombian taekwondo practitioner.

She won a bronze medal in welterweight at the 2015 World Taekwondo Championships, after being defeated by Nur Tatar in the semifinal. Her achievements at the Pan American Taekwondo Championships include a gold medal in 2012, a silver medal in 2016, and a  bronze medal in 2014.

She won one of the bronze medals in her event at the 2022 South American Games in Asunción, Paraguay.

References

External links

1993 births
Living people
Colombian female taekwondo practitioners
Taekwondo practitioners at the 2019 Pan American Games
Pan American Games medalists in taekwondo
Pan American Games bronze medalists for Colombia
World Taekwondo Championships medalists
Pan American Taekwondo Championships medalists
Taekwondo practitioners at the 2011 Pan American Games
Taekwondo practitioners at the 2015 Pan American Games
Medalists at the 2019 Pan American Games
21st-century Colombian women
South American Games gold medalists for Colombia
South American Games bronze medalists for Colombia
South American Games medalists in taekwondo
Competitors at the 2014 South American Games
Competitors at the 2022 South American Games